Ivana Šojat (born 26 February 1971) is a Croatian writer from Osijek. She published poetry, novellas, essays, short stories and novels, the most famous of which is Unterstadt.

Upon its release, it won several prestigious literary awards, and was adapted and put onstage as a theatrical play.

Biography 
Šojat graduated from high school in Osijek with a major in journalism, studied math and physics at Pedagogy Academy in Osijek, and French in Belgium. She worked as a translator, foreign correspondent, columnist, and as an editor of theatrical releases in Croatian National Theatre in Osijek. Most recently, she won the nomination of the Croatian Democratic Union (HDZ) to run for mayor of Osijek in the 2017 local elections.

For her contribution to Croatian literature, she earned distinctive honors and awards. She fought in the Croatian War of Independence.

Writing 
Šojat's published works include novels, novellas, short stories, essays, and poetry. Two of her novels have been translated into Macedonian.

As a literary translator, Šojat translated many books from English and French into Croatian. In her works, she often examines the less palatable aspects of human nature including concealed truth, domestic violence, rape, divorce, postwar resentment, ethnic cleansing, etc. In her view,  
"What is kept unsaid, swallowed, undigested in a human being, individual, but also in the ethnic, racial, religious and other groups, grows to some sort of a critical mass when the trauma cannot stay confined inside. Then we have shocking news like suicides of the veterans, murders, everything up to wars, massacres, aggression."

In her novel Unterstadt [Lower Town] Šojat traces the struggle of a family from a minority group during times of socio-political upheaval. She builds the plot on historical records regarding a
troubled Volksdeutsche family living in Yugoslavia for four generations.

The story has characteristics of realistic fiction, although sources describe it as a bildungsroman as well as a coming of age novel.

The novel Ničiji sinovi [Nobody's Sons] is a story about the disintegration of a family caused by war and alcoholism. The story sheds light on a couple whose marriage falls apart.

The novel Jom Kipur tells the story of a warrior with posttraumatic stress disorder (PTSD). The plot, like in the novel Šamšiel [Shamsiel], intertwines the themes of love and hatred with the horrors of wars and post-war reconciliation.

In Ruke Azazelove [Azazel's Hands] and in the collection of the short stories Emet, Šojat examines the "inner person" in more depth by employing stream of consciousness, interior monologues and flashback narrative to highlight the characters' psychological conflicts exposed through the process of purifying emotions in order to reconcile with the past.

The protagonists in Šojat’s stories are highly engaged in the dramatic process of catharsis.

Unterstadt [Lower Town] was adapted and put onstage in Croatian National Theatre in Osijek, and won a prestigious award  as the best play in 2012. ZKM Theatre (Zagreb) in co-production with Academy of Dramatic Art, University of Zagreb adapted selective scenes from Unterstadt [Lower Town] and presented them on stage as a play entitled Elza hoda kroz zidove [Elza walks through the walls] in 2015.

Honors 
 Red Danice hrvatske s likom Marka Marulića [Order of Danica Hrvatska with Face of Marko Marulić], medal of the President of the Republic of Croatia for promoting Croatian culture domestically and abroad, 2016
 Pečat Grada Osijeka [Stamp of the City of Osijek], a public recognition for exceptional contribution to literature, 2011

Awards 
 Ksaver Šandor Gjalski, 2010, novel Unterstadt [Lower Town]
 Fran Galović, 2010, novel Unterstadt
 Josip i Ivan Kozarac, 2010, novel Unterstadt
 Vladimir Nazor, 2009, novel Unterstadt
 Blaženi Ivan Merz, 2005, poetry Utvare [Apparitions]
 Kozarčevi dani [Kozarac Days], 2002, novel Šamšiel [Shamsiel]

Bibliography 
 Novel Ezan, Fraktura Zagreb, 2018, 
 Poetry Ljudi ne znaju šutjeti [People Don't Know to Keep Silent], Fraktura Zagreb, 2016, 
 Short stories Emet i druge priče [Emet and Other Stories], Fraktura Zagreb, 2016, 
 Novel Jom Kipur [Yom Kippur], Fraktura Zagreb, 2014, 
 Novel Ničiji sinovi [Nobody's Sons], Fraktura Zagreb, 2012, 
 Novellas Ruke Azazelove [Azazel's Hands], Fraktura Zagreb, 2011, 
 Novel Unterstadt [Lower Town], Fraktura Zagreb, 2009 
 Novellas Mjesečari [Sleepwalkers], Fraktura Zagreb, 2008, 
 Poetry Sofija plaštevima mete samoću [Sofija Sweeps Loneliness With Cloaks], V.B.Z. Zagreb, 2008, 
 Essays I past će sve maske [And All Masks Will Drop], Alfa Zagreb, 2006, 
 Short stories Kao pas [Like a Dog], DHK Rijeka, 2006, 
 Poetry Utvare [Apparitions], Solidarnost Zagreb, 2005, 
 Poetry Uznesenja [Ascensions], Triler i DHK Rijeka, 2003, 
 Novel Šamšiel [Shamsiel], Matica hrvatska Osijek, 2002, 
 Poetry Hiperbole [Hyperboles], Hrašće Drenovci, 2000,

Sources

External links
 Ivana Šojat, author's website, accessed May 4, 2017
 Ivana Šojat, author's profile and books at Fraktura, accessed May 4, 2017
 Ivana Šojat author's profile at goodreads.com, accessed May 4, 2017
 Review Unterstadt, by Helena Sablić Tomić, Moderna vremena, 2010, accessed May 4, 2017
 Article blog.dnevnik Unterstadt, 2016, accessed May 4, 2017
 Article in Večernji list, 2012, accessed May 4, 2017
 Article by Strahimir Primorac in Vijenac MH 438/2010
 Article by Andrija Tunjić in Vijenac MH 490/2012
 News vijesti.hrt Unterstadt, play award, accessed May 4, 2017
 News radio.hrt Šojat running for Osijek mayor's seat in election 2017, accessed May 5, 2017 

1971 births
Living people
People from Osijek
Croatian women short story writers
Croatian short story writers
Croatian novelists
Croatian women poets
21st-century Croatian poets
21st-century Croatian women writers